Yasawa Island Airport  is an airport on the Yasawa Island in the Fiji's Western Division. The airport is a short strip running the width of the island, and is mainly used for general aviation and transporting guests to resorts on the island.

Airlines and destinations

References 

Airports in Fiji